Otto Tibulski (15 December 1912 – 25 February 1991) was a German footballer who played as a defender for Schalke 04 and Hertha BSC. He also represented the Germany national team, earning two caps between 1936 and 1939.

References

External links
 

1912 births
1991 deaths
German footballers
Association football defenders
Germany international footballers
FC Schalke 04 players
Hertha BSC players
Place of birth missing